Chris Lee (born 9 September 1971) is a New Zealand former cricketer. He played first-class cricket for Auckland and Wellington between 1991 and 1997.

See also
 List of Auckland representative cricketers

References

External links
 

1971 births
Living people
New Zealand cricketers
Auckland cricketers
Wellington cricketers
Cricketers from Wellington City